The governor of Rhode Island is the head of government of the U.S. state of Rhode Island and serves as commander-in-chief of the state's Army National Guard and Air National Guard. The current governor is Democrat Dan McKee. In their capacity as commander of the national guard, the governor of Rhode Island also has the title of captain general.

Qualifications
The following are the requirements to be elected Governor of Rhode Island:
Be at least eighteen years of age
Be a resident of the State of Rhode Island for at least thirty days
Be a registered voter in Rhode Island

Constitutional authority and responsibilities
Section I, Article IX of the Rhode Island Constitution reads,

The Governor of Rhode Island is elected every four years and is limited to two consecutive terms. As the Chief executive of the Government of Rhode Island, the Governor is supported by a number of elected general officers and appointed directors of state agencies.

Responsibilities granted to the Governor by the Rhode Island Constitution include the position of Commander-in-chief of all components of the Rhode Island National Guard, so long as they remain un-federalized by the President of the United States, and the responsibility to submit the annual state budget to the Rhode Island General Assembly.

The Governor also has the power to grant pardons and veto bills, resolutions and votes subject to a two-thirds override.

Party affiliation

Colonial Rhode Island, 1640–1775

See also 

 Lieutenant Governor of Rhode Island

References

External links
Governor of Rhode Island: Proclamations Issued from the Rhode Island State Archives
Office of the Governor Executive Orders from the Rhode Island State Archives
Lists of Executive Orders, 1973-1997 from the Rhode Island State Archives
State Photographer Alex Tavares photographs from the Rhode Island State Archives

Governors
Governor
1775 establishments in the Thirteen Colonies